Katy is a city in the U.S. state of Texas within the Greater Katy area, itself forming the western part of the Greater Houston metropolitan area. Homes and businesses may have Katy postal addresses without being in the City of Katy. The city of Katy is approximately centered at the tripoint of Harris, Fort Bend, and Waller counties. Katy had a population of 21,894 at the 2020 U.S. census, up from 14,102 in 2010.

First formally settled in the mid-1890s, Katy was a railroad town along the Missouri–Kansas–Texas (MKT) Railroad which ran parallel to U.S. Route 90 (today Interstate 10) into downtown Houston. The fertile floodplain of Buffalo Bayou, which has its source near Katy, and its tributaries made Katy and other communities in the surrounding prairie an attractive location for rice farming. Beginning in the 1960s, the rapid growth of Houston moved westward along the new Interstate 10 corridor, bringing Katy into its environs. Today, Katy lies at the center of a broader area known as Greater Katy, which has become heavily urbanized.

While largely subsumed into Greater Houston, the town of Katy is still notable for Katy Mills Mall, the Katy Independent School District, and its historic town square along the former right-of-way of the MKT railroad.

History

In the early 1800s Katy was known as "Cane Island", named for the creek that runs through the area, a branch of Buffalo Bayou. The creek was filled with tall cane, not native to the area. It was presumed to have been planted by either the Karankawa Indians or Spanish explorers to aid in fur trapping until the 1820s.

In 1845 James J. Crawford received a land grant that included this area. The hot summers and thick clay soil made it difficult to attract settlers to the area. Crawford, Peter Black, John Sills and the families of former slaves Thomas (Mary) Robinson and Milto McGinnis were the only recorded residents of Cane Island in 1875.

In 1895, James Oliver Thomas laid out a town, and in January 1896 the town of Katy was named through Thomas's post office application. The name "Katy" was derived from the MKT Railroad Company, which was commonly referred to as "the K-T" (also its stock exchange symbol). This common designation soon evolved into "the Katy."

The anticipations of prosperity would bring growth to the new town which was developed around the original train stop and railroad tracks. By the early 1900s many families had come by train and wagon to establish Katy. Cotton and peanuts and corn were the first successful crops, but rice soon became the primary commodity crop. Katy later became known for rice farming; the first concrete rice driers in the state of Texas were built here in 1944 and still stand as landmarks. The farming community well supported local businesses as several hotels, stores, livery stables and saloons were prospering.

On September 8, 1900, the town's early efforts were swept clean by the Great Galveston Hurricane of 1900, the deadliest hurricane in U.S. history. All but two of the original Katy homes were lost in the storm. Despite this, Cane Island rebuilt and continued to grow.

In 1945 the city of Katy was incorporated as a municipality. C. L. Baird was the first mayor. Boundaries were determined by finding the area that contained the most residents and was reasonably sized so that it could be managed by city services.

The construction and opening of Interstate 10 in 1966 allowed for rapid development of the area, as Houston expanded westward. This section was widened in 2008 to an average of 26 lanes, and in some areas 30 lanes total including 6 feeder and 4 HOV lanes for roughly 22 miles, making it the widest freeway in the world. The population was 9,866 in 1988, 8,005 in 1990, 11,775 in 2000, and 15,591 in 2014. Currently, Katy has grown to a population of well over 16,000 residents and almost 270,000 in the Greater Katy area. Katy has won national accolades for growth and sustainability, including the Gadberry Group naming Katy as one of "9 from 2009" most notable high-growth areas in the United States.

Geography

Katy is often further defined as either "Old Towne Katy" or "Greater Katy". Old Towne Katy refers to the proper of Katy, which was incorporated in 1945. Its boundaries, as defined by the Katy Independent School Divisions zoning, runs just south of Kingsland Blvd, stretching across Interstate 10 to Morton Road. Katy Fort Bend Road and Cane Island Creek act as the east and west boundaries, The Greater Katy area includes the city of Katy plus large sections of unincorporated land surrounding the city corresponding to the boundaries of the  Katy Independent School District.

Greater Katy includes communities such as Cinco Ranch, Green Trails, Grayson Lakes, Seven Meadows, Pine Mill Ranch, Silver Ranch Firethorne and Grand Lakes. It also encompasses suburban developments from the 1970s and 1980s, such as Memorial Parkway, Kelliwood and Nottingham Country.

Old Towne Katy's new upscale communities include Pin Oak Village, The Falls at Green Meadows, Cane Island and The Enclave. Large developments underway have included new residential communities boarding the east border of Mary Joe Peckham Park and the Katy Boardwalk. The city of Katy's government has also placed a large focus on the downtown redevelopment plan which included the new city hall building and an upcoming downtown green space. Further projects included Typhoon Texas Water Park, Katy Independent School District's Legacy Football Stadium, Katy Independent School District's Rhodes Stadium, Momentum Indoor Climbing Center, REI Climb Store and the YMCA at Katy Main Street.

The city of Houston's extraterritorial jurisdiction stretches well west of Katy. This means that a few unincorporated lands in the Katy area could be annexed by the city of Houston at some time in the future, though it is unlikely since Houston is unable to provide basic services to these isolated areas. The city of Katy's extraterritorial jurisdiction, meanwhile, is limited to parcels of land west and north of the city itself.

Climate
The climate in this area is characterized by hot, humid summers and generally mild to cool winters. According to the Köppen climate classification system, Katy has a humid subtropical climate, abbreviated "Cfa" on climate maps.

Demographics

As of the 2020 United States census, there were 21,894 people, 6,495 households, and 5,283 families residing in the city. At the 2019 American Community Survey, Katy had an estimated population of 21,729, up from 14,102 at the 2010 United States census. The racial and ethnic makeup of the city was 58.6% non-Hispanic white, 6.6% Black and African American, 0.4% American Indian and Alaska Native, 4.3% Asian, 1.4% two or more races, and 29.4% Hispanic and Latin American of any race.

There were 6,651 households in 2019, with an average of 3.01 persons per household from 2015-2019. The city of Katy had a median rent of $1,030 at the 2019 American Community Survey, and a median household income of $83,091. The per capita income for Katy was $37,207 and 3.7% of its population lived at or below the poverty line.

At the 2000 United States census, there were 11,775 people in "Old Katy", 3,888 households, and 3,083 families residing in the city. The population density was 1,103.7 people per square mile (426.1/km2). There were 4,072 housing units at an average density of 381.7 per square mile (147.3/km2). The racial makeup of the city was 83.98% White, 4.24% African American, 0.56% Native American, 0.50% Asian, 0.04% Pacific Islander, 8.65% from other races, and 2.03% from two or more races. Hispanic or Latino people of any race were 23.75% of the population.

There were 3,888 households, out of which 45.7% had children under the age of 18 living with them, 63.9% were married couples living together, 10.9% had a female householder with no husband present, and 20.7% were non-families. 17.4% of all households were made up of individuals, and 6.7% had someone living alone who was 65 years of age or older. The average household size was 3.00 and the average family size was 3.37.

In the city, the population was spread out, with 31.5% under the age of 18, 8.7% from 18 to 24, 30.9% from 25 to 44, 20.7% from 45 to 64, and 8.1% who were 65 years of age or older. The median age was 33 years. For every 100 females, there were 98.6 males. For every 100 females age 18 and over, there were 97.5 males.

The median income for a household in the city was $51,111, and the median income for a family was $57,741. Males had a median income of $38,412 versus $33,004 for females. The per capita income for the city was $21,192. 8.4% of the population and 7.0% of families were below the poverty line. Out of the total people living in poverty, 9.1% were under the age of 18 and 6.5% were 65 or older.

Religion 
Places of worship in modern-day Katy represent non-denominations as well as the denominations of Catholicism, Islam, Latter-Day Saints, Judaism, Hindu, and Protestantism.

The original city of Katy was once known as the "City of Churches" due to the role of religion in daily life. Not only were churches highly concentrated in the city, but according to area historian Carol Adams, the residents had a fervent religious belief. Circa the 1960s the city erected a "City of Churches" sign which has since been removed.

Donald G. Burgs Jr., pastor of Alief Baptist Church, estimated that the downtown area of Katy had six to seven church buildings. The first church established in the city was First Baptist Church; in 1898 reverend T.L. Scruggs held the church's first meeting. In 2007 it moved to a facility on Pin Oak Road due to growth, and in 2016 it had about 4,000 worshippers. Alief Baptist Church bought the former First Baptist building. The city's Catholic population began with a group from the modern Czech Republic and has been served by the St. Bartholomew the Apostle Catholic Church; the church offers Mass in English, Spanish, and Vietnamese.

Economy
Several corporations are headquartered in areas surrounding Katy.

Igloo Corporation is headquartered west of Katy in unincorporated Waller County. Academy Sports and Outdoors has its corporate offices and product distribution center in unincorporated western Harris County.

BP America is headquartered in the Houston Energy Corridor and is the area's largest employer, with 5,500 employees on its Westlake campus as of 2009. BP's Katy operations include engineering and business support for much of BP's onshore operations in the contiguous United States, as well as its operations in the Gulf of Mexico.

In 2017, Amazon constructed a 1 million-square-foot distribution center near the intersection of Highway 90 and Woods Road. In 2021, it was estimated that new development projects were near completion to stimulate the local economy.

With the economy improving after 2009, retail centers were developed throughout Katy to accommodate the rapid residential growth. The major retail growth is taking place along Katy Fort Bend Road near the east entrance to the Katy Mills shopping mall. In August 2010, H-E-B Food & Drug opened a new UP format store at I-10 and Pin Oak. In July 2013, Costco announced that it would open a store at the southwest corner of Grand Parkway and I-10 in 2014. Construction began in August 2013. The new store was planned for completion by early spring 2014 and would be Costco's fourth Houston-area location.

In September 2018, Katy Asian Town was established. This multicultural dining, shopping and residential area is anchored by Asian grocer, HMart and Japanese book retailer Kinokuniya. Cultural activities held in Katy Asian Town include Chinese New Year with lion dancing performances, as well as open market art and comics events outside Kinokuniya. Katy Asian Town is also home to the Andretti Indoor Karting and Games facility, featuring kart racing, video gaming, virtual reality attractions and dining.

The Katy Area Economic Development Council serves as the economic development organization for the area. Founded in 2003, the Katy Area Economic Development Council's (Katy Area EDC) mission is to establish the Katy area as the premier location for families and businesses through planned economic growth and economic development. Since its inception, the Katy Area EDC has grown to over 210 members, has a budget of $900,000 and has assisted in the creation of over 16,200 jobs and more than $2.5 billion in capital investment. Katy Area EDC is a full-service private, non-profit, 501 (c) 6 economic development corporation.

Government and infrastructure
Katy is a home-rule city, chartered in 1945. Residents within the city limits are governed by a nonpartisan city council made up of five councilmembers and the mayor. The city is split into two wards; two council members are elected from each ward, and one council member and the mayor are elected at-large. The mayor appoints a councilmember to serve as mayor pro tempore with a council vote of approval.

Residents within the city limits pay city taxes and receive municipal police, fire, EMS, and public works service. The city has territory in three counties, each of which has its own representative governments. The counties have a greater influence on area outside the incorporated city limits.

The Katy area lies in three counties. Residents in unincorporated Harris, Fort Bend and Waller counties are governed by those counties. The county residents elect representative county commissioners who represent them on the county courts of each county, presided over by the county judge of each county.

Harris County Precinct Three, headed by Tom Ramsey as of 2021, serves the Harris County portion of Katy. The Fort Bend County portion of Katy is under Fort Bend County Precinct Three headed by Andy Meyers.

Harris Health System (Harris County's hospital district) operates the Danny Jackson Health Center in the Bear Hunter Plaza in a nearby area of Harris County. Fort Bend County does not have a hospital district. OakBend Medical Center serves as the county's charity hospital which the county contracts with.

Education

Primary and secondary schools
People who live in Katy are zoned to schools in the Katy Independent School District. While multiple Katy ISD schools have "Katy, Texas" postal addresses, only a portion are located in and/or serve the Katy city limits.

Elementary schools 
 Zelma Hutsell Elementary School
 Katy Elementary School
 WoodCreek Elementary School
 Bryant Elementary School
 Robertson Elementary School

Middle schools 
 Katy Junior High School
 WoodCreek Junior High School

High schools 
 Katy High School, the oldest high school, is located nearest to the center city. It was established in 1898, and relocated to its present location in 1947. Katy ISD's three alternative education schools (Martha Raines High School, Miller Career and Technology Center, and the Opportunity Awareness Center) are all located within the city.

Charter & Private Schools 
The following schools operate outside of Katy ISD's jurisdiction: 
 Aristoi Classical Academy is a K-12 charter school in Katy.
 Mirus Academy is an independent school in the city center, serving 8th - 12th grades.

Colleges
Katy ISD (and therefore the City of Katy) is served by the Houston Community College System. HCC Northwest College operates the Katy Campus in an unincorporated section of Harris County.

The Bible Seminary offers non-denominational college-level Bible study and ministry training, including a variety of graduate-level master's programs. These programs include an MA in Biblical archeology, with dynamic leaders in the field. It also offers a Bible certificate program for local church members and leaders.

The University of Houston purchased the Verde Park Development site, with plans to break ground on a Katy Campus at I10 and 99. Its construction was completed in 2019.

Public libraries
Katy is served by the Katy Branch of Harris County Public Library (HCPL) at 5414 Franz Road. The branch is a partnership between HCPL and the City of Katy. The city joined the county library system in 1921. The Katy Garden Club started the first library, which was housed in several private houses. At a later point it shared space with the Katy Fire Department. The first Katy branch opened in 1940. The Friends of the Katy Library began in 1972. The construction of the current  branch began in 2002. The current branch building opened for regular business in Monday April 28, 2003, with its grand opening ceremony on the previous day.

Parks and recreation
Harris County operates the Mary Jo Peckham Community Center at 5597 Gardenia Lane, Katy, Texas 77493.
The City of Katy Dog Park is located at 5414 Franz Road.
The annual Katy Rice Harvest Festival is two days of continuous live entertainment, craft and food booths, carnival and more.

Transportation

Mass transit
Metropolitan Transit Authority of Harris County (METRO) operates the Kingsland Park and Ride (Route 221) east of Katy at 21669 Kingsland Boulevard. In February 2008 METRO opened a new park and ride location at the Cinemark parking lots near the intersection of Grand Parkway and I-10. The new Route is #222. Currently, only these express routes operate to and from downtown Houston during morning and evening commute hours.

METRO opened a six-story garage Park And Ride Bus Depot at the intersection of I-10 west and the Grand Parkway to service commuters.

Intercity buses
Greyhound Bus Lines operates the Katy Station at Millers Exxon.
Megabus.com stops at Katy Mills en route between Austin, San Antonio, and Houston. This serves as a park-and-ride location for riders from the Katy and Greater Houston area.

Airports
Privately owned airports for fixed-wing aircraft for public use located near Katy include:
 Sack-O-Grande Acroport (also known as Harbican Airport) in unincorporated Harris County
 Houston Executive Airport in unincorporated Waller County
 West Houston Airport in unincorporated Harris County

Privately owned airports for private use include:
 Hoffpauir Airport in unincorporated Harris County
 Cardiff Brothers Airport in unincorporated Fort Bend County

Area airports with commercial airline service include George Bush Intercontinental Airport and William P. Hobby Airport, both of which are in Houston.

Notable people

 Rodney Anderson, former NFL running back 
 Clint Black, country singer and musician 
 Kimberly Caldwell, American Idol contestant, singer, actress, television hostess
 Bill Callegari, businessman, engineer, and a Republican member of the Texas House of Representatives from Katy from 2001 to 2015 
 Christian Cappis, professional soccer player at Brøndby IF
 The Catt family, 21st-century bank robbing family
 Roger Creager, Texas country singer and songwriter
 Dan Crenshaw, Texas Representative
 Andy Dalton,  quarterback in the NFL for the New Orleans Saints
 Bernice Edwards, classic female blues singer, pianist and songwriter
 Paddy Fisher, college football player
 Courtney Ford, actress
 De'Aaron Fox, professional basketball player for the Sacramento Kings in the NBA and McDonald's All American
 Janeane Garofalo, actress, stand-up comedian, and writer
 Cullen Gillaspia, Houston Texans fullback in the NFL
 Sammy Guevara, Professional Wrestler from AEW
 Julie Henderson, model
 Jalen Milroe, quarterback for Alabama Crimson Tide football
 Bo Levi Mitchell, professional quarterback currently playing for the Hamilton Tiger-Cats in the Canadian Football League, 2014 & 2018 Grey Cup MVP
 Tyler Myers, pro hockey player for the Vancouver Canucks in the National Hockey League
Josh Nebo (born 1997), basketball player for Maccabi Tel Aviv of the Israeli Premier Basketball League
 Megan Nicole, singer
 Sage Northcutt, UFC fighter
 Renee O'Connor, actress and director, best known for her role as Gabrielle in Xena: Warrior Princess
 Jesse Sorensen, professional wrestler
 Ty Tabor, guitarist and vocalist of melodic progressive metal band King's X
 Brett Velicovich, soldier
 Renée Zellweger, actress and producer

See also
The MKT Depot

References

External links

 City of Katy official website
 Greater Katy Area Chamber of Commerce
 Harris County block book map (historical map showing portion in Harris County): PDF format, JPG format

 
Cities in Texas
Cities in Fort Bend County, Texas
Cities in Harris County, Texas
Cities in Waller County, Texas
Greater Houston